Ian Henderson may refer to:
Ian Henderson (footballer) (born 1985), English footballer for Salford City
Ian Henderson (musician), New Zealand drummer
Ian Henderson (news presenter) (born 1952), Australian news presenter
Ian Henderson (police officer) (1927–2013), British former Director of Intelligence in Bahrain
Ian Henderson (politician) (born 1940), member of the Queensland Parliament
Ian Henderson (racing driver) (born 1980), American racing driver
Ian Henderson (rugby league) (born 1983), English-born Scottish rugby league player
Ian Henderson (rugby union) (1918–1991), Scottish player
Ian Henderson (RAF officer) (1896–1918), English World War I flying ace

See also
 Iain Henderson (born 1992), rugby union player
Iain Henderson (Royal Navy officer) (born 1948)